Dane Propoggia (born 24 April 1990) is an Australian professional tennis player and competes mainly on the ATP Challenger Tour and ITF Futures, both in singles and doubles.

Propoggia reached his highest ATP singles ranking of No. 295 on 2 February 2015, and his highest ATP doubles ranking, of No. 109 on 8 July 2013.

Career finals (12)

Singles: 7 (3 Titles)

Doubles (6) (4 Titles)

References

External links
 
 
 
 

1990 births
Living people
Australian male tennis players
Place of birth missing (living people)